Al Dammam (816) is an  of the Royal Saudi Navy.

Development and design 

The ships' combat system, produced by Armaris (a Direction des Constructions Navales/Thales Group joint venture), is armed with Aster 15 Surface to Air Missiles (SAM) launched from SYLVER vertical launchers (SYLVER - SYstème de Lancement VERtical). As with the La Fayette class, the primary offensive weapon is the anti-surface Exocet missile. The ships' main gun is the OTO Melara 76 mm super-rapid firing gun replacing the modèle 100 TR  automatic gun of the La Fayette. There are also four aft-mounted  torpedo tubes, firing DTCN F17 heavyweight anti-submarine torpedoes.

Construction and career 
Al Dammam was launched on 7 September 2002 at the DCNS shipyard in Lorient and commissioned on 23 October 2004.

Al Riyadh-class frigates
Three Al Riyadh-class frigates have been built:
Al Riyadh (812) the lead ship commissioned in 2002
Makkah (814) commissioned in 2004
Al Dammam (816) commissioned in 2004

References 

2002 ships
Ships built in France
Ships of the Royal Saudi Navy
Al Riyadh-class frigates